In chess, prophylaxis  consists of a move or series of moves done by a player to prevent their opponent from taking some action. Such preventative moves, or prophylactic moves, aim not only to improve one's position but also to restrict the opponent in improving their own.

Many standard and widespread opening moves can be considered prophylactic. One common prophylactic idea is the advance of the  near a castled king, which can be done to provide luft and/or to prevent a pin; another is to transfer one's king to the b-file after castling queenside so as to protect an unmoved a-pawn, among other purposes.

Using prophylaxis is an essential skill at advanced levels of play. Famous practitioners of prophylactic play include Aron Nimzowitsch, Tigran Petrosian, and Anatoly Karpov; even  players, such as Mikhail Tal and Garry Kasparov, make use of prophylaxis.

Etymology
The term prophylaxis comes from the Greek προφύλαξις, profýlaxis, "guarding or preventing beforehand".

Example

The diagram shows a common opening known as the Sicilian Defense, Najdorf Variation, arising after the moves 1.e4 c5 2.Nf3 d6 3.d4 cxd4 4.Nxd4 Nf6 5.Nc3 a6. Black's fifth move is a prophylactic move that intends to prevent White from placing a knight or bishop on b5.

References

Further reading

Chess terminology
Chess strategy

pt:Anexo:Glossário de enxadrismo#Profilaxia